Ian Cade Campbell (born May 15, 1985 in Garden City, Kansas) is a former starting defensive end for Kansas State University. He is a former walk-on and two-time team captain for the Wildcats.

High school
Campbell went to high school at Cimarron High School.  He earned All-Hi Plains League, All-Area, Hutchinson all-area 3A top 11 and 3A all-state honorable mention honors as a junior linebacker.  He also received all-league, all-area, Hutchinson all-area 3A Top 11 and honorable mention all-state honors at linebacker as a senior.  He set the career tackle record for Cimarron with 324 tackles and also lettered three years in basketball.

College

2004
Campbell redshirted the 2004 season.

2005
He appeared in 10 of 11 of the Wildcats' games.  He blocked a punt against Missouri that was returned for a touchdown.  He earned team’s Purple Pride award as the top walk-on, displaying quality play, leadership and work ethic.

2006
He was one of five Wildcats to start and appear in all 13 games. Campbell earned consensus First-team All-Big 12 honors from the league’s coaches, the Associated Press, The Kansas City Star, the Dallas Morning News, the Fort Worth Star-Telegram, the Houston Chronicle and the San Antonio Express-News. He was named Big 12 Defensive Player of the Year by the Houston Chronicle.  He was a semi-finalist for the Hendricks Award. He was also an honorable mention All-American by CNN/SI.com.  Campbell finished third on the team in total tackles with 67 and led the Wildcats in both tackles for losses (17.5) and sacks (11.5). His tackle total ranked No. 1 among all Big 12 defensive linemen. He led the Big 12 and ranked 18th nationally in tackles for losses.  His sack total tied the K-State single-season record, while ranking No. 2 in the Big 12 and 10th nationally.  He also ranked third in the Big 12 with three fumble recoveries in conference games.  He collected at least one sack in 9 of 13 games.

2007
To start the season, Campbell was switched from defensive lineman to outside linebacker to accommodate Ron Prince's 3-4 defense. He seem to struggle but he was a First-team All-Big 12 linebacker by the league’s coaches and Second-team All-Big 12 linebacker by the Associated Press, The Kansas City Star and the Waco Tribune-Herald. After the 2007 season he ranked sixth all-time at K-State with 16 career sacks.  Started all 12 games at either end or linebacker.  He recorded 45 tackles, including a team-best 11 tackles for loss.  Campbell led the Big 12 with four fumble recoveries, which also was one shy of the school record.

2008
Campbell had another strong year, earning Second-team All-Big 12 defensive lineman honors. He closed out his senior season strong with 4.5 sacks and 47 tackles, and 8 tackles for loss. Campbell recorded his best games of the 2008 season against Louisiana and Iowa State, carding 11 tackles, 1.5 sacks and a pass break up against the Ragin’ Cajuns, while closing out his career with 10 stops and a blocked field goal against the Cyclones.

Campbell ranks sixth in school history with 20.5 career sacks and compiled 37.5 tackles for loss in his career.

Statistics

NFL

St. Louis Rams
On April 26, 2009, was signed by the St. Louis Rams as an undrafted free agent. He received a two- year, $705,000 contract from the Rams, with none guaranteed. He was cut during final cuts on September 5. He was re-signed to the teams' practice squad, but released from it a week later.

CFL 
On April 13, 2010, was signed for a two-year contract plus an option with the Montreal Alouettes but was released prior to seeing any game action.

Personal
Campbell is the son of Curtis and Audrey Campbell. Campbell has five siblings and he enjoys lifting weights, riding motorcycles, and serving patrons at his restaurant, Black Lion's Den.

References

1985 births
Living people
People from Gray County, Kansas
American football defensive ends
Kansas State Wildcats football players
People from Garden City, Kansas